Bimba - È clonata una stella (Bimba - A star is cloned) is a 2002 Italian comedy film written, directed and starred by Sabina Guzzanti.

It received a Nastro d'Argento nomination for the best original song ("Mucca cannibala").

Cast 
 Sabina Guzzanti as Bimba (Anna Cicciarelli) / Lucy
 Francesco Paolantoni as  Dr. Cassi
 Adriana Asti as Fatima 
 Antonio Catania as Dr. Macaluso
 Giovanni Esposito as  Emilio
 Iaia Forte as Drama Teacher
 Stefania Orsola Garello as  PR
 Neri Marcorè as  'Cavoli a merenda' Presenter
 Caterina Guzzanti as  Rachele
 Olimpia Carlisi  as The Madonna

References

External links

2002 comedy films
Italian comedy films
Films directed by Sabina Guzzanti
2002 directorial debut films
2002 films